Pilgrim II may refer to:
 , a United States Navy motor launch employed as a river patrol boat during her naval service from 1942 to 1947
 Peace Pilgrim II, Ronald Leonard Podrow (May 16, 1926 – December 19, 2004), an American pacifist
 Pellegrino II of Aquileia (died 1204), a patriarch of Aquileia in northern Italy
 Pilgrim von Puchheim (died 1396), archbishop of Salzburg as Pilgrim II
 Pilgrim II, bronze medal winning horse in team jumping at the 2007 FEI European Jumping Championship